Chimichagua is a city and municipality in the central region of the Department of Cesar, Colombia.  Approximately one third of the municipality of Chimichagua is water. The municipality seat lies by the Cienaga de Zapatosa marshes.

Etymology

Chimichagua was the name of the Chimila cacique that inhabited the area at the time of the Spanish conquest. Chimichagua or Chiminigagua is the name of the supreme being of the Muisca. Muisca and Chimila pertain to the same language family; the Chibcha language.

History

Pre-Columbian

The territory of the municipality of Chimichagua was inhabited by the indigenous group known as the Chimila who at the time of the Spanish arrival were established in most of the Cesar River basin and its valley between the Sierra Nevada de Santa Marta and the Serranía del Perijá mountain ranges and bordering the Magdalena River.

Spanish conquest and colonization

Chimichagua was founded by Jose Fernando de Mier y Guerra on December 8, 1748 accompanied by Sebastian de Eslava who was in representation of the Viceroy. The village was first named Nuestra Señora de la Purísima Concepción de Chimichagua. The population of this village migrated to other nearby villages such as Tamalameque, Santa Cruz de Mompox, Valencia de Jesús and Valledupar due to accessibility problems.

Republicanism

Chimichagua became a municipality by Ordinance 54 of 1892. In 1967 with the creation of the Department of Cesar Chimichagua became one of its municipalities.

Politics

Administrative divisions

Corregimientos

Chimichagua has 9 corregimientos:

Candelaria
El Guamo
Las Vegas
Mindinguilla
Saloa
Sempegua
Soledad
La Mata
El Jobo

References

External links
 chimichagua.gov.co
 Chimichagua official website

 
Municipalities of Cesar Department
Populated places established in 1748